Fuse is an album by Joe Henry, released in 1999.

Production
The album was co-produced by T Bone Burnett, and partly mixed by Daniel Lanois. Henry initially attempted to have Dr. Dre produce Fuse.

Critical reception
The A.V. Club wrote that the album "continues to develop Trampoline'''s spooky style of bluesy Americana." The Chicago Reader'' wrote that "the entire album exudes a kind of sweet, danceable darkness, with sparse drum loops, moody bass lines, and delicate guitar and synthesizer washes."

Track listing
All songs written by Joe Henry except where noted
 "Monkey" – 4:01
 "Angels" – 5:42
 "Fuse" – 4:18
 "Skin and Teeth" – 3:52
 "Fat" – 3:25
 "Want Too Much" – 5:44
 "Curt Flood" – 3:49
 "Like She Was a Hammer" – 4:27
 "Great Lake" – 5:31
 "Beautiful Hat" - 3:57
 "We'll Meet Again" (Ross Parker, Hughie Charles) – 4:25

Personnel
Joe Henry - vocals, guitar, organ, bass
Jakob Dylan - vocals
Jean McClain - vocals
Jamie Muhoberac - piano, organ
Dave Palmer - piano
Randy Jacobs - bass, guitar
Chris Whitley - guitar (4, 8)
Anthony Wilson - guitar
Jennifer Condos - bass
Daniel Lanois - bass, claves
Greg Richling - bass
Freddie "Ready Freddie" Washington - bass
Carla Azar - drums
Curt Bisquera - drums
The Dirty Dozen Brass Band (10)
Revert Andrews - trombone
Gregory Davis - trumpet
Brian Swartz - trumpet
Efrem Towns - trumpet
Kevin Harris - saxophone
K.R. King - saxophone
Roger Lewis - saxophone

References

1999 albums
Joe Henry albums
Albums produced by Joe Henry